Jonny Briggs is a Children's BBC kitchen sink realism television programme first broadcast in 1985. It revolves around the exploits of a young boy, the eponymous hero (played by Richard Holian), his pet dog, Razzle, and his eccentric family members: Mam (Jane Lowe) and Dad (Leslie Schofield), older sister Rita (Sue Devaney) and older brothers Albert (Tommy Robinson) and Humph (Humphrey) (Jeremy Austin). Another older sister, Marilyn, is mentioned but never seen.  The stories often centre on Jonny's school life, where he and his best friend Pam are constantly in battle with the dreadful twins Jinny and Josie.

Previously some of the Jonny Briggs books by Joan Eadington were read on Jackanory.  In the books Jonny has two older sisters—Pat and Sandra.

The programme was filmed in Bradford and set in Middlesbrough

The theme tune "The Acrobat" composed by J A Greenwood in 1936, is considered synonymous with the series. The piece of music chosen for the programme was recorded by trombonist Colin Buchanan.

Cast
 Jonny Briggs (Richard Holian)
 Rita Briggs (Sue Devaney)
 Albert Briggs (Tommy Robinson)
 Humphrey Briggs (Jeremy Austin)
 Dad (Leslie Schofield)
 Mam (Jane Lowe)
 Mavis (Debbie Norris)
 Miss Broom (Karen Meagher)
 Mr. Box (Harry Beety)
 Mr. Hobbs (Simon Chandler)
 Mr. Badger (John Forbes-Robertson)
 Pamela Dean (Georgina Lane)
 Jinny (Adele Parry)
 Josie (Rachel Powell)
 Nadine (Abigail Fisher)
 Martin (Dexter Lynch)
 Lily Spencer (Sophie Buckley)
 Peter (Alex Moran)
 Razzle (Fizzy)

Series guide
Series 1: 13 episodes, broadcast 11 November 1985 – 23 December 1985
Series 2: 20 episodes, broadcast 10 November 1986 – 20 January 1987

External links

1985 British television series debuts
1987 British television series endings
1980s British children's television series
BBC children's television shows
Television shows based on children's books
Social realism
English-language television shows